Messier 7 or M7, also designated NGC 6475 and sometimes known as the Ptolemy Cluster, is an open cluster of stars in the constellation of Scorpius. The cluster is easily detectable with the naked eye, close to the "stinger" of Scorpius. With a declination of −34.8°, it is the southernmost Messier object.

M7 has been known since antiquity; it was first recorded by the 2nd-century Greek-Roman astronomer Ptolemy, who described it as a nebula in 130 AD. Italian astronomer Giovanni Batista Hodierna observed it before 1654 and counted 30 stars in it. In 1764, French astronomer Charles Messier catalogued the cluster as the seventh member in his list of comet-like objects. English astronomer John Herschel described it as "coarsely scattered clusters of stars".

Telescopic observations of the cluster reveal about 80 stars within a field of view of 1.3° across. At the cluster's estimated distance of 980 light years this corresponds to an actual diameter of 25 light years. The age of the cluster is around 200 million years while the brightest member star is of magnitude 5.6. In terms of composition, the cluster contains a similar abundance of elements other than hydrogen and helium as the Sun.

On August 29, 2006, Messier 7 was used for first light image of the Long Range Reconnaissance Imager (LORRI) telescope on the Pluto-bound New Horizons spacecraft.

As of January 2022, Messier 7 is one of the few remaining Messier objects not photographed by the Hubble Space Telescope. This is mainly due to those objects' angular diameter or lack of scientific significance. Most such objects are open clusters of large angular diameter that would require thousands of photos due to Hubble's small field of view. (For comparison, Hubble's well known panoramic photo of the Andromeda Galaxy, covering less than half of our galactic neighbor, required approximately 400 individual movements and 7400 exposures.)

Gallery

See also
 List of Messier objects
 List of open clusters
 New General Catalogue

References

External links

 Messier 7, SEDS Messier pages
 
 
 New Horizons probe captures M7
 

Astronomical objects known since antiquity
007
NGC objects
Open clusters
Orion–Cygnus Arm
Scorpius (constellation)